A picador is one of the two horsemen in a Spanish bullfight.

Picador may also refer to:
 The Picador (film), a 1932 French drama
Picador (imprint), a British publishing brand
 Picador (Picasso), 1889, his earliest extant painting
 Vincent Picador, an early 1950s aircraft engine
"The Picadore", an 1889 march by American composer John Philip Sousa

See also
Picador Travel Classics, a 1990s series of travel literature re-prints